FNM Class E.750 is the name of two different classes of electric railcars:
 E.750, built in 1947 and retired in 1963
 E.750, built from 1982 to 1993 and no longer in use